Club Deportiu Masnou is a Spanish football team based in El Masnou, in the autonomous community of Catalonia. Founded in 1920 it plays in the regional Segona Catalana, sixth tier in Spanish football, holding home games at Estadi Municipal de El Masnou, with a capacity of 2,000 seats.

Season to season

14 seasons in Tercera División

External links
Official website 
Futbolme team profile 
Resultados futbol team profile 

Football clubs in Catalonia
Association football clubs established in 1920
Divisiones Regionales de Fútbol clubs
1920 establishments in Spain